Philip McElwaine (born 5 December 1957) is an Australian boxer and motorcycle club member. He was born in Maitland, New South Wales. He competed at the 1976 Summer Olympics in Montreal.  He was the Middleweight Gold medalist in the 1978 Commonwealth Games.

In 1984, McElwaine was arrested and charged with seven counts of murder for his part in the Milperra massacre.  The charges were later reduced to that of affray after police acted as character witnesses for him, stating that McElwaine, who was a volunteer at the Police and Community Youth Club, was "a monument to the police boys' movement as a whole." McElwaine was the only club member to be acquitted of the manslaughter and murder charges that were brought against them.

References

External links

1957 births
Living people
Middleweight boxers
People from New South Wales
Olympic boxers of Australia
Boxers at the 1976 Summer Olympics
Boxers at the 1978 Commonwealth Games
Commonwealth Games gold medallists for Australia
Australian male boxers
Commonwealth Games medallists in boxing
Bandidos Motorcycle Club
Medallists at the 1978 Commonwealth Games